A sengese is a throwing knife of the Matakam from northeastern Nigeria or northern Cameroon.

Uses 
It is sinuous in shape and its handle is often dressed in leather. It can also be used as an exchange currency.

Bibliography 
 Barbara Winston Blackmun, Blades of Beauty and Death: African Art Forged in Metal, 1990 
 Werner Fischer, Manfred A. Zirngibl, African Weapons: Knives, Daggers, Swords, Axes, Throwing Knives, 1978 
 Jan Elsen, De fer et de fierté, Armes blanches d’Afrique noire du Musée Barbier-Mueller, 5 Continents Editions, Milan, 2003

References

Blade weapons
African weapons
Daggers
Knives